Beitbridge is a town in Musina Local Municipality in the Limpopo province of South Africa.

Beitbridge is a border crossing on the Limpopo River, located just south of Beitbridge in Zimbabwe. It is the busiest border post in the region, handling as many as 500 trucks each day. The bridge was named after mining financier Alfred Beit, who provided funds for its construction.

Climate
Beitbridge has a hot desert climate (Köppen: BWh).

References

Populated places in the Musina Local Municipality
South Africa–Zimbabwe border crossings
Beitbridge